SCGC may refer to:
 Screen Composers Guild of Canada, a Canadian music industry association
 Sugar Cane Growers Cooperative of Florida
 Sugar Cane Growers Council, a Fijian trade union
 Union Glacier Blue-Ice Runway, in Antarctica